Constant Martin (May 11, 1830 – June 16, 1894) was a Belgian-American civil servant. Elected to the Wisconsin State Assembly in 1866, he represented Kewaunee County in the Assembly.

Biography
Martin was born on May 11, 1830 in the Province of Brabant, Belgium. After working as a clerk during his young adult life, Martin immigrated to Philadelphia and started studying English. He married fellow Belgian immigrant Fannie Gillon there in 1853; the couple had their first child in 1855 or 1856. The family moved to Red River, Wisconsin in 1859 and took up residence there.

During his time in Red River, Martin was a land dealer and insurance agent. In 1866, he was elected to a one-year term in the Wisconsin State Assembly. He was a Democrat in his political views. Martin was among the first Belgian-Americans from northeastern Wisconsin to make it to the Assembly; the group also included Joseph Wery, Benjamin Fontaine, John B. Eugene and Grégoire Dupont. Martin moved on from elected positions to become a government assessor in 1867, something that tied in well with Martin's previous experience as a prominent real estate dealer in northeastern Wisconsin.

1870 was a pivotal year in Martin's life; his wife had a second child but then perished along with both children later in the year. Also in that year, Martin married New York native Mary Louisa Rosenberg. In his professional life, Martin stepped into new roles as a United States Marshall, postmaster of Red River and town chairman of Red River, a position he held for another four years. He was also a local justice for five years and superintendent of Kewaunee County schools for two years in the early 1870s.

In 1874, Martin moved to Green Bay, Wisconsin, and served on the school board from 1885 to 1892. He died on June 16, 1894 at age 64. Martin is buried in Woodlawn Cemetery.

References

1831 births
1894 deaths
American real estate businesspeople
American businesspeople in insurance
Democratic Party members of the Wisconsin State Assembly
People from Kewaunee County, Wisconsin
People from Green Bay, Wisconsin
Belgian emigrants to the United States
19th-century American politicians
School superintendents in Wisconsin
American surveyors
United States Marshals
Wisconsin postmasters
Burials in Wisconsin
School board members in Wisconsin